Jonathan Kariara (1935–1993) was a Kenyan poet who wrote works including "A Leopard Lives in a Muu Tree". He was also for several years the manager of Oxford University Press's branch office in Nairobi. Over the same period he ran regular workshops for writers in order to encourage and stimulate local literary creativity. In the late-1970s, his preferred stamping ground was Sadler House (now Consolidated Bank House), Makerere University, where he encountered artistic and literary figures including Ngũgĩ wa Thiong'o, Okot P'Bitek and Elimo Njau. He later had a close literary kinship with poet-compatriot Marjorie Macgoye.

Notes

References
 Ilieva, Emilia, and Lennox Odiemo-Munara. "Macgoye's Gift to Writing And National Awareness." Daily Nation, 21 August 2005.
 Koigi, John. "Njau Finally Signs His Paintings." Daily Nation, 2 December 2006.

1935 births
1993 deaths
Kenyan poets
Kenyan male writers
20th-century poets
International Writing Program alumni